Sparganothis robinsonana is a species of moth of the family Tortricidae. It is found in Texas in the United States.

The wingspan is 21–22 mm.

References

Moths described in 2012
Sparganothis